Sheila Roberts (born February 26, 1951, in Seattle, Washington, USA) is an American author of women's fiction and romance. As Sheila Rabe, she writes contemporary and historical romance novels.

Her books often appear as Reader's Digest Condensed Books. Her novel Angel Lane was named one of Amazon's top ten romances in 2009. Her novel The Nine Lives of Christmas is now a Hallmark movie. Her book On Strike for Christmas was adapted into a television movie by Lifetime.

Bibliography

As Sheila Roberts

 On Strike for Christmas, St. Martin’s Press, 2007
 Bikini Season, St. Martin’s Press, 2008
 Angel Lane, St. Martin’s Press, 2009
 Love in Bloom, St. Martin’s Press, 2009
 Small Change, St. Martin’s Press, 2010
 The Snow Globe, St. Martin’s Press, 2010
 The Nine Lives of Christmas, St. Martin’s Press, 2011

Life in Icicle Falls Series
 Better Than Chocolate, Harlequin MIRA, 2012
 Merry Ex-Mas, Harlequin MIRA, 2013
 What She Wants, Harlequin MIRA, 2013
 The Cottage on Juniper Ridge, Harlequin MIRA, 2014
 The Tea Shop on Lavender Lane, Harlequin MIRA, 2014
 The Lodge on Holly Road, Harlequin MIRA, 2014
 A Wedding on Primrose Street, Harlequin MIRA, 2015
 Christmas on Candy Cane Lane, Harlequin MIRA, 2015
 Welcome to Icicle Falls, Harlequin MIRA, 2015
 Home on Apple Blossom Road, Harlequin MIRA, 2016
 Starting Over on Blackberry Lane, Harlequin MIRA, 2017
 Christmas in Icicle Falls, Harlequin MIRA, 2017

Moonlight Harbor Series
 Welcome to Moonlight Harbor, Harleguin MIRA, 2018

As Sheila Rabe
 The Light-Fingered Lady, Pageant Books, 1989
 Faint Heart, Diamond Books, 1990
 Ghostly Charade, Zebra Books, 1991
 The Improper Miss Prym, Diamond Books, 1991
 Lady Luck, Diamond Books, 1992
 The Lost Heir, Diamond Books, 1992
 The Wedding Deception, Diamond Books, 1993
 The Accidental Bride, Zebra, 1994
 Bringing Out Betsy, Zebra, 1994
 Miss Plympton's Peril, Jove Books, 1994	
 An Innocent Imposter, Zebra, 1995	
 The Adventuress, Zebra, 1996
 All I Want for Christmas, Jove, 2000
 Be My Valentine, Jove, 2001
 A Prince of a Guy, Berkley Books, 2001

References

External links
 Official website of Sheila Roberts

1951 births
Living people
20th-century American novelists
21st-century American novelists
American romantic fiction writers
American women novelists
20th-century American women writers
21st-century American women writers